Mozilla was the mascot of Netscape Communications Corporation and subsequently the Mozilla Foundation. Its appearance has varied and the mascot has been retired from active use.

Description 
Named after the original name, Mosaic, for Netscape Navigator and Godzilla, Mozilla was the mascot of the Netscape Communications Corporation and subsequently the Mozilla Foundation.

History

Green design 
The name "Mozilla" was already in use at Netscape as the codename for Netscape Navigator 1.0. Programmer Jamie Zawinski came up with the name during a meeting while working at the company. The name stood for "Mosaic killer", as the company's goal was to displace NCSA Mosaic as the world's number one web browser. Initially the mascot took various forms, including that of a helmeted astronaut or "spaceman", but the eventual choice of a Godzilla-like lizard which went well with the theme of crushing the competition, especially because of the similarity between the names. This design rendered Mozilla in the form of a green and purple cartoon lizard, designed by Dave Titus in 1994.

Mozilla featured prominently on Netscape's web site in the company's early years. However, the need to project a more "professional" image (especially towards corporate clients) led to him being removed. Mozilla continued to be used inside Netscape, though, often featuring on T-shirts given to staff or on artwork adorning the walls of the Netscape campus in Mountain View.

When Netscape acquired the website directory NewHoo in 1998, they rebranded it the Open Directory Project with the nickname "DMOZ" (Directory of Mozilla) due to its similarity to the Mozilla project. A green and purple image of Mozilla was placed on every page of the site, which continued even after Netscape's disbanding when it was acquired by AOL.

Red design 

The name "Mozilla" later became more prominent when it was used for the open source browser of the same name. With the launch of the mozilla.org web site in 1998, the mascot was redesigned as a larger, fiercer red Tyrannosaurus rex. The new design was by Shepard Fairey of "Obey Giant" and Barack Obama "Hope" poster fame.

By September 2012, the mascot – referred to as "the dino" and "he" – had been "retired from active duty", removed from official Mozilla branding, and replaced by a "Mozilla" wordmark, all lowercase and set in Meta Bold typeface. (And by July 2019, the latter had been replaced by "moz://a", in Mozilla's Zilla Slab Highlight typeface and within a rectangle of a tone or color contrasting with that of the lettering.)

See also
Netscape
Mozilla
The Book of Mozilla
 List of computing mascots
 :Category:Computing mascots

References

External links
The Mozilla Museum - many pictures of Mozilla
Mozilla teeshirt art
Dave Titus - creator of Mozilla

Computing mascots
Mozilla
Netscape
Mascots introduced in 1994
Lizard mascots